Logo

 Alanwar TV is a Kuwaiti satellite television channel based in London, England.The channel was launched in 2004.

The launch of Al-Anwar channel began in the year 2004 AD to broadcast everything that the viewer needs of all types and cultures to call for tolerance, renunciation of violence and acceptance of the other. Still continuing to defend our master Muhammad and his family Public policy Al-Anwar channel's discourse is balanced and balanced, characterized by moderation and calm dealing with issues, and seeks honesty and honesty in the proposition. The channel's discourse follows the method of constructive dialogue, and takes boldness in offering, content, and technical and artistic creativity as a method for delivering its message. premises Al-Anwar satellite channel was launched to present a valid alternative, by presenting an Islamic vision that is open to the other and with a modern framework, in order to present an original and bright image that has been distorted by backward practices. Al-Anwar channel came to provide solutions to the problems that afflict our societies, and to present innocent, meaningful and useful entertainment. Our goals Al-Anwar satellite channel is working on the following: – Spreading the culture of moderation and tolerance and the call to renounce violence and acceptance of the other. It is the culture that represents the spirit of Islamic teachings and human values, which constitute a solid basis for dialogue with the other. Rejection of extremism and extremism, as the channel presents a sound mediating approach, rejecting all forms of extremism and extremism. – Contribute to the development and development of our societies, as the programs broadcast by the channel are in the interest of the development of societies, as the channel carries a message that contains in its contents social service and the advancement of our nation and our societies - Caring for children and youth by providing a new kind of purposeful and useful entertainment. Spread the spirit of unity and cooperation among the peoples of the world and reject division. The channel works on positive, calm and moderate subtraction. Al Anwar TV broadcasts on four satellites, Nilesat, Hot Bird, Glasgow and Aptos, and viewers can receive its broadcasts for free.

See also

Television in Iraq

References

External links
 Alanwar TV Official website
Alanwar TV Official Youtube Channel
Alanwar TV Official Twitter Acoount 
Alanwar TV Official Facebook page
Alanwar TV Official Instagram Account
Alanwar TV Official Tiktok Channel

Television stations in Iraq
Arab mass media
Arabic-language television stations
Television channels and stations established in 2004
Arab Spring and the media